Ramaria conjunctipes is a coral mushroom in the family Gomphaceae. It is found in North America and Thailand.

References

External links

Gomphaceae
Fungi described in 1923
Fungi of Asia
Fungi of North America